Miss Brazil World (or Miss Mundo Brasil, in Portuguese) is a beauty contest held annually which aims to choose the best candidate to represent their country with honor in the traditional international Miss World contest. The Brazilian representatives began to be sent from the year 1958, with girl from Pernambuco Sônia Maria Campos. Since 2006 who manages the sending of representatives to the international event is the team led by Henrique Fontes (Global Beauties Website director). The country has so far only an international crown, obtained with the medicine studant Lúcia Petterle in 1971.

Organization 

The event excels in originality and social responsibility, having been the first large national beauty contest to include in its official activities evidence of talent, sports and fashion, in addition to encouraging the practice of philanthropic actions (following its motto, Beauty with a Purpose). All of this, not to mention the privilege and responsibility of representing Brazil - all its culture and biodiversity - at Miss World, which is currently considered the main beauty contest on the planet, since it was the pioneer worldwide, having its first edition held in 1951.

Since taking on the coordination of the contest in 2006, Henrique Fontes has been trying to reposition the image of the Brazilian stage with a Miss World organization by bringing the winners of the competitions to honor the event. The visit of the British Julia Morley, CEO of the international dispute in 2013 to watch and closely monitor the election of the most beautiful Brazilian, consolidating the work of Fontes ahead of the organization for more than ten years. Among the holders of the Miss World title who have already been present in the national, the following stand out: Unnur Birna, Icelandic elected Miss World 2005, came to Brazil to honor the election of Jane Borges in the highly disputed competition of Miss Mundo Brasil 2006; Seven years after the arrival of Unnur, it was the turn of the Chinese Yu Wenxia to participate in the election of the most beautiful Brazilian of 2013 who crowned the gaucho Sancler Frantz as the winner; The third and last time that a Miss World stepped on Brazilian soil was the Indian Manushi Chhillar in 2018 as part of her tour of "Beauty with a Purpose" Chhlar visited several cities in the country such as the capital Brasília.

Titleholders

Miss Brazil for Miss World 
Note: The current franchise owner started the competition on 2006.
Color key

Miss Brazil for Miss Supranational 
Note: Between 2014 and 2017, the Brazilian representatives was sent by another organization, led by Luiz Roberto Kauffmann.
Color key
  Declared as Winner
  Ended as runner-up
  Ended as one of the finalists or semifinalists

Miss Brazil for Miss Grand International 

Note: in 2014, Yameme was chosen by a different organization, led by Gerson Antonelli. In 2019, 2020 and 2022, the CNB separately held the pageants  to select the country representatives for the international stage.
Color key

Miss Brazil for Miss Charm International 
Note: The international competition was supposedly scheduled to debut in 2021 with Ariely Stoczynski as the Brazilian representative. The pageant was then cancelled. The pageant is now set to debut on February 16, 2023 with Luma Russo as the Brazilian representative.
Color key

Miss Brazil for Miss United Continents 
Note: Before 2013, Miss United Continents was Miss Continente Americano, a continental pageant.
 
Color key

Miss Brazil for Miss Eco International 
Note: 1 Brazil compete also with another representative, for the island of Fernando de Noronha.
 
Color key

Miss Brazil for Reina Hispanoamericana 
Note: Before 2007, Reina Hispanoamericana was Miss Sudamericana, a continental pageant.
 
Color key

Miss Brazil for Reinado Internacional del Café 
Note: Before 2007, another organization was responsible for sending the Brazilian representatives.
 
Color key

Miss Brazil for Reinado Internacional de la Ganadería 
Note: The international competition started on 2008.
 
Color key

References

External links 

 Miss World
 Miss Brazil World 

 
Recurring events established in 1958
1958 establishments in Brazil
Brazilian awards